William Seamer (died 1402), of Scarborough, Yorkshire, was an English politician.

He was a Member (MP) of the Parliament of England for Scarborough in 1378 and 1386.

References

14th-century births
1402 deaths
English MPs 1378
English MPs 1386
Politicians from Scarborough, North Yorkshire